Dick Yarmy (February 14, 1933 – May 5, 1992) was an American actor. He appeared in numerous films and television shows throughout the 1960s to the 1990s.

Biography
Yarmy was born in New York in 1933, son of William Yarmy and his wife, Consuelo ( Deiter), who were Jewish and Catholic, respectively. Yarmy was the younger brother of actor and Get Smart star, Don Adams. He also had an elder sister, Gloria Ella Yarmy (later Gloria Burton), a writer who screenwrote an episode of Get Smart.

Dick Yarmy graduated from the New York University with a degree in engineering and began his acting career in 1968, appearing in the TV series Get Smart, also That Girl, The Partners, The Partridge Family, and Arnie. He also appeared in several films including Bone, The Kentucky Fried Movie, The Swinging Barmaids, and Carpool among others. Yarmy also appeared in commercials, such as George and Marge for Union Oil.

Personal life
Dick Yarmy was married and had one daughter.

Death
Yarmy died of lung cancer in Studio City, Los Angeles on May 5, 1992, aged 59. He was buried in Los Angeles National Cemetery.  A group of comedians called "Yarmy's Army" formed to support him in his final illness, and continues after his death doing benefit concerts to help fellow comedians in need.

Selected filmography

Film
 Bone (1972) - Bank Teller
 The Take (1974) - Roclair
 The Swinging Barmaids (1975) - Comic
 Brothers (1977) - District Attorney Wayne
 The Kentucky Fried Movie (1977) - Taylor (segment "Courtroom")
 Rabbit Test (1978) - Ist Presidential Aide
 The One Man Jury (1978) - Hooker's Costumer
 Racquet  (1979) - Cab Driver
 Pray TV (1982) - Dr. Ben Gay
 Movers & Shakers (1985) - Other Executive #3

Television

 Get Smart (1968-1970) - Brady
 That Girl (1970-1971) - Fred Thompson
 The Partners (1971) - Andy
 The Partridge Family (1971) - Patterson
 Arnie (1971) - Attendant
 The Don Rickles Show (1972) - Carl
 Me and the Chimp (1972) - Dr. Oldham
 The New Dick Van Dyke Show (1973) - Policeman
 McMillan & Wife (1973) - O'Hara
 Love, American Style (1972-1973) - Marty
 Police Story (1974) - Cab Driver
 It Couldn't Happen to a Nicer Guy (1974) - Wineberger
 Emergency! (1973-1975) - Firefighter Joe Bailey
 The Bureau (1976) - Prentiss
 Holmes & Yoyo (1976) - Dr. Yates
 Duffy (1977) - Postman
 A Guide for the Married Woman (1978) - Harry
 Quincy, M.E. (1979) - 2nd Executive
 Friends (1979) - Cabbie
 Laverne & Shirley (1979) - Ludwig Stenger
 B. J. and the Bear (1979) - Uncredited
 Tenspeed and Brown Shoe (1980) - Brandowyn
 Mork & Mindy (1978-1980) - Sid/Ron
 Taxi (1980) - Spencer
 Foul Play (1981) - Professor Himmel
 Bosom Buddies (1982) - Mr. Silverman
 Happy Days (1983) - Holstein
 E/R (1984) - Burton Summers
 Down to Earth (1985) - Mr. Teaberry
 The Jeffersons (1985) - Phil
 Amazing Stories (1985) - VCR
 You Again? (1986) - Mr. Rosen
 The Wizard (1986) - Uncredited
 They Came from Outer Space (1991) - Dr. Milshick (final appearance)

References

External links
 
 

1933 births
1992 deaths
20th-century American male actors
American male film actors
American male television actors
American people of Hungarian-Jewish descent
Jewish American male actors
Male actors from New York City
Deaths from lung cancer in California
Burials at Los Angeles National Cemetery
20th-century American Jews